St Peter's Church is a ruined church in Castle Park, Bristol, England. It was bombed during World War II and is now preserved as a memorial.

The foundation of the church can be traced back to 1106 when it was endowed on Tewkesbury Abbey, with a 12th-century lower tower, the rest of the church being built in the 15th century. Excavations in 1975 suggest that this was the site of Bristol's first church; the 12th-century city wall runs under the west end of the present church. It was bombed during the Bristol Blitz of 24–25 November 1940 and ruined. It is maintained as a monument to the civilian war dead of Bristol.

It has been designated by English Heritage as a grade II* listed building.

The church ran St Peter's Hospital, a workhouse located between the church and Floating Harbour which was destroyed by bombing during the Bristol Blitz.

Archives
Parish records for St Peter's church, Bristol are held at Bristol Archives (Ref. P. St PE) (online catalogue) including a baptism register, marriage registers and a burial register. The archive also includes records of the incumbent,  churchwardens, charities, societies and vestry plus plans and photographs. Some of these records were severely damaged when the church was bombed but duplicate entries of the parish registers can be found in  the bishop's transcripts of these records.

See also
 Churches in Bristol
 Grade II* listed buildings in Bristol

References

12th-century church buildings in England
Towers completed in the 12th century
15th-century church buildings in England
Grade II* listed ruins
Saint Peter
Saint Peter
Ruins of churches destroyed during World War II
Saint Peter
Saint Peter
World War II sites in England